The clear craze was a marketing fad from the late 1980s to early 2000s, often equating transparency with purity. Inspired by Ivory's "99 and 44/100 percent pure" campaign for bath soap, and by low-calorie or "light" beverages, sodas were redesigned in the 1980s and 1990s as being free of artificial dyes, such as the caffeine-free and preservative-free Crystal Pepsi. Personal hygiene products were then relaunched as clear dye-free gels, and many electronics had transparent cases.

History

Since the introduction of Plexiglas in the late 1930s, devices have been made with clear shells to expose the electromechanical components inside. At the 1939 New York World's Fair, a 139 Pontiac Deluxe Six engine with a clear Plexiglas body was on display. Peaking in the 1960s and 1970s, transparent-shelled devices fell out of fashion until the clear craze in the late 1980s. Following the breakup of the Bell System in the mid 1980s, a surge of manufacturers began creating phones, many of them transparent and having flashing neon lights when the phone rings.

A trend of "light" beer with fewer calories started in the 1960s. Then, color was identified in the marketing industry as a "tool for visual persuasion" toward a product's purity and health consciousness. Ivory soap was adapted from its classic milky solution and its slogan of "99 and 44/100 percent pure". This led up the clear craze starting in the 1980s. To showcase the reduction of calories or artificial flavors, many companies released clear versions of their products. The clear cola market was entered by Crystal Pepsi on April 13, 1992 featuring no preservatives or caffeine, although the existing Pepsi also did not have preservatives, and a caffeine-free version was already available. Coca-Cola soon responded with Tab Clear. In August 1992, Coors announced Zima, a clear, carbonated malt beer and in 1993, Miller released Miller Clear to mixed reviews.

Gillette released versions of its existing deodorants and shaving creams in a clear gel form, which have continued indefinitely.

Through the 1990s, the clear trend included transparent watches, staplers, calculators, handheld gaming devices such as the Nintendo Game Boy, and computers such as Apple's iMac G3.

See also
Retrofuturism

References

External links
 Clear, and cashing in, Newsweek, February 2, 1993

Product management
1980s fads and trends
1990s fads and trends
2000s fads and trends